Michael James Fitzgerald (November 14, 1957 - September 17, 2021) was an American writer. He authored more than 20 books and is best known for his technical books.

Fitzgerald was born in Portland, Oregon.  In addition to English, his technical works have been translated into Spanish, Portuguese, French, German, Polish, Korean, Japanese, and Chinese. Fitzgerald is also a novelist and has also written extensively for XML.com. An avid diarist, Fitzgerald has written over 7,000 pages in his private journals since 1976.

Bibliography

Technical works
 Ruby Pocket Reference, 2nd Edition (O'Reilly Media, 2015)
 Introducing Regular Expressions (O'Reilly Media, 2012)
 Metaweb JavaScript Templating (O'Reilly Media, 2007)
 Google Ajax Search API, with Ali Pasha (O'Reilly Media, 2007)
 Ruby Pocket Reference (O'Reilly Media, 2007)
 Learning Ruby (O'Reilly Media, 2007)
 XML Pocket Reference, Third Edition (O'Reilly Media, 2005)
 XML Hacks (O'Reilly Media, 2004)
 Learning XSLT (O'Reilly Media, 2003)
 XSL Essentials (John Wiley & Sons, 2001)
 Building B2B Applications with XML (John Wiley & Sons, 2001)

Fiction
 Song of Falling Leaves (Overdue Books, 2014)

References

External links
 
 Michael J. Fitzgerald's personal blog

1957 births
American information and reference writers
American instructional writers
Writers from Portland, Oregon